This article lists various tornado records. The most "extreme" tornado in recorded history was the Tri-State tornado, which spread through parts of Missouri, Illinois, and Indiana on March 18, 1925. It is considered an F5 on the Fujita Scale, even though tornadoes were not ranked on any scale at the time. In addition, it is the deadliest single tornado in United States history with 695 fatalities. It was also the third most costly tornado in history at the time, but has been surpassed by several others non-normalized. When costs are normalized for wealth and inflation, it still ranks third today.

The deadliest tornado in world history was the Daulatpur–Saturia tornado in Bangladesh on April 26, 1989, which killed approximately 1,300 people. In the history of Bangladesh at least 19 tornadoes killed more than 100 people each, almost half of the total for the rest of the world.

For 37 years, the most extensive tornado outbreak on record, in almost every category, was the 1974 Super Outbreak, which affected a large area of the central United States and extreme southern Ontario in Canada on April 3 and April 4, 1974. Not only did this outbreak feature 148 tornadoes in only 18 hours, but an unprecedented number of them were violent; 7 were of F5 intensity and 23 were F4. During the peak of this outbreak there were 16 tornadoes on the ground at the same time. More than 300 people, possibly as many as 330, were killed by tornadoes during this outbreak. However, this record was later broken during the 2011 Super Outbreak, which resulted in 360 tornadoes and 324 tornadic fatalities. However, the most tornadoes spawned in the shortest amount of time is 104 over 5 hours and 26 minutes, during the 1981 United Kingdom tornado outbreak on 23 November 1981.

Tornado outbreaks

Most tornadoes in a single 24-hour period 

The 2011 Super Outbreak was the largest tornado outbreak spawned by a single weather system in recorded history; it produced 360 tornadoes from April 25–28, with 216 of those in a single 24-hour period on April 27 from midnight to midnight CDT, fifteen of which were violent EF4–EF5 tornadoes. 348 deaths occurred in that outbreak, of which 324 were tornado related. The outbreak largely contributed to the record for most tornadoes in the month of April with 773 tornadoes, almost triple the prior record (267 in April 1974). The overall record for a single month was 542 in May 2003, which was also broken.

The infamous 1974 Super Outbreak of April 3–4, 1974, which spawned 148 confirmed tornadoes across eastern North America, held the record for the most prolific tornado outbreak in terms of overall tornadoes for many years, and still holds the record for most violent, long-track tornadoes (7 F5 and 23 F4 tornadoes). More significant tornadoes occurred within 24 hours than any other day on tornado record. Due to a secular trend in tornado reporting, the 2011 and 1974 tornado counts are not directly comparable.

Most violent tornadoes  (F4/EF4 and F5/EF5) in an outbreak

Longest continuous outbreak and largest autumnal outbreak 
Most tornado outbreaks in North America occur in the spring, but there is a secondary peak of tornado activity in the fall. It is historically less consistent from year to year but can include exceptionally large and/or intense outbreaks. In 1992, an estimated 95 tornadoes broke out in a record 41 hours of continuous tornado activity from November 21 to 23. This is also among the largest-known outbreaks in areal expanse. Many other very large outbreaks have occurred in autumn, especially in October and November, such as the 2002 Veterans Day weekend outbreak, in which 83 tornadoes occurred from November 9 to 11, and November 17, 2013, when 73 tornadoes were produced in 11 hours.

Greatest number of tornadoes spawned from a hurricane 
The greatest number of tornadoes spawned from a hurricane is 120 from Hurricane Ivan in September 2004, followed by Hurricane Beulah with 115 in September 1967 and 103 from Hurricane Frances in September 2004 (a couple weeks before Ivan). Hurricanes prior to the 1990s, when tornado records were more sparse, perhaps produced more tornadoes than were officially documented.

Tornadoes annually and monthly

Most tornadoes for each calendar month

Most tornadoes in a single year 
On average 1,200 tornadoes happen in a year in the United States. The most confirmed tornadoes in a single year is 2004, which had 1817 confirmed tornadoes. This was mostly boosted by a large tornado outbreak sequence in May of 2004, where 509 tornadoes occurred. It also had help from a very active fall and winter tornado season.

Tornado casualties and damage

Deadliest single tornado in world history 

On April 26, 1989, in Bangladesh a large tornado took at least 1,300 lives.

Deadliest single tornado in US history 
The Tri-State tornado of March 18, 1925, killed 695 people in Missouri (11), Illinois (613), and Indiana (71). The outbreak it occurred with was also the deadliest known tornado outbreak, with a combined death toll of 747 across the Mississippi River Valley.

Most damaging tornado 
Similar to fatalities, damage (and observations) of a tornado are a coincidence of what character of tornado interacts with certain characteristics of built up areas. That is, destructive tornadoes are in a sense "accidents" of a large tornado striking a large population. In addition to population and changes thereof, comparing damage historically is subject to changes in wealth and inflation. The 1896 St. Louis–East St. Louis tornado on May 27, incurred the most damages adjusted for inflation, with an estimated $5.36 billion (2022 USD). In raw numbers, the Joplin tornado of May 22, 2011, is considered the costliest tornado in recent history, with damage totals at $3.71 billion (2022 USD). Until April 2011, the Bridge Creek-Moore tornado of May 3, 1999, was the most damaging, Which was later surpassed by the 2011 Tuscaloosa–Birmingham tornado, with a damage total of $3.18 Billion (2022 USD), though this tornado would only last about a month as the most costly as it would be surpassed by the previously mentioned Joplin tornado.

Lists of damage and fatality records

Largest and most powerful tornadoes

Highest winds observed in a tornado 

These are also the highest wind speeds observed on Earth.

On May 31, 2013, a tornado hit rural areas near El Reno, Oklahoma. These winds may possibly be as high or higher than the winds recorded on May 3, 1999. Despite the recorded windspeed, the El Reno tornado was later downgraded back to EF3 due to the fact that no EF5 damage was found, likely due to the lack of sufficient damage indicators in the largely rural area west of Oklahoma City.

Winds were measured at  using portable Doppler radar in the Red Rock, Oklahoma tornado during the April 26, 1991 tornado outbreak in north-central Oklahoma. Though these winds are possibly indicative of F5 intensity, this particular tornado's path never encountered any significant structures and caused minimal damage. Thus it was rated F4.

While never observed, the 1764 Woldegk and 1990 Goessel tornadoes is believed to have had winds >, which would make them one of the strongest tornadoes in history.

Longest damage path and duration 
Some very long track (VLT) tornadoes were later determined to be successive tornadoes spawned by the same supercell thunderstorm, which are known as a tornado family. The Tri-State tornado, however, appeared to have no gaps in the damage. A six-year reanalysis study by a team of severe convective storm meteorologists found insufficient evidence to make firm conclusions but does conclude that it is likely that the beginning and ending of the path was resultant of separate tornadoes comprising a tornado family. The  segment from central Madison County, Missouri to Pike County, Indiana is likely one continuous tornado and the  segment from central Bollinger County, Missouri to western Pike County, Indiana is very likely a single continuous tornado.

Longest path and duration tornado family 
What at one time was thought to be the record holder for the longest tornado path is now thought to be the longest tornado family, with a track of at least  on May 26, 1917, from the Missouri border across Illinois into Indiana. It caused severe damage and mass casualties in Charleston and Mattoon, Illinois.

It began in Noble County, Oklahoma and ended in Jackson County, Michigan, producing many tornadoes in Missouri and Illinois.

Largest path width 
However, it was revealed that these winds did not impact any structures, and as a result the tornado was downgraded to EF3 based on damage.

Highest forward speed 
This tornado occurred during the December 2021 Midwest derecho and tornado outbreak. Other weak tornadoes have approached or exceeded this speed, but this is the fastest forward movement observed in a significant tornado.

Other important tornado forward speeds
As of 2023, the National Oceanic and Atmospheric Administration does not recognize this YouTube video or its claim to the extreme forward moving speed.

Greatest pressure drop 

On April 21, 2007, a  pressure deficit was reported when a tornado struck a storm chasing vehicle in Tulia, Texas. The tornado caused EF2 damage as it passed through Tulia. The reported pressure drop far exceeds that which would be expected based on theoretical calculations.

There is a questionable and unofficial citizen's barometer measurement of a  drop around Minneapolis in 1904.

Early tornadoes

Earliest-known tornado in Europe 
 The earliest recorded tornado in Europe struck Freising (Germany) in 788.
 The earliest-known Irish tornado appeared on April 30, 1054, in Rostella, near Kilbeggan. The earliest-known British tornado hit central London on October 23, 1091, and was especially destructive.

Earliest-known tornado in the Americas 
 An apparent tornado is recorded to have struck Tlatelolco (present day Mexico City), on August 21, 1521, two days before the Aztec capital's fall to Cortés. Many other tornadoes are documented historically within the Basin of Mexico.

First confirmed tornado and first tornado fatality in present-day United States 
 August 1671 – Rehoboth, Massachusetts
 July 8, 1680 – Cambridge, Massachusetts – 1 death

Earliest-known tornado in Asia 
 The earliest recorded Asian tornado struck near the city of Calcutta in present-day West Bengal, India in 1838. It was described as moving remarkably slow across its  path southeast over the span of 2 to 3 hours. It was recorded to cause significant damage to the area, including  hail being observed at the Dum Dum weather observatory.

First published scientific studies of a tornado 
A few scientists in Europe, the US, and elsewhere documented the occurrence of tornadoes in the late 18th and early-mid 19th centuries to try to discern patterns of distribution and sometimes with inferences about formative processes and dynamics.

For intensive studies of tornadoes, these are the earliest known publications:

 1765: German scientist Gottlob Burchard Genzmer published a detailed survey of the damage path of an extremely violent tornado which occurred near Woldegk, Germany, on 29 June 1764. It covers the entire, 33 km (18.6 mi) long track and also includes eyewitness reports as well as an analysis of the debris and hail fallout areas. Genzmer calls the event an "Orcan" and only compares it to waterspouts or dust devils. Based on the damage survey, modern day meteorologists from the ESSL were able to assign a rating of F5 T11, making it the earliest known F5 tornado worldwide. The T11 rating on the Torro-Scale also places this event among the most violent tornadoes ever documented worldwide.
 1839–41: A detailed survey of damage path of significant tornado that struck New Brunswick, New Jersey on 19 June 1835, which was the deadliest tornado in New Jersey history. The path was surveyed by many scientists on account of its location between New York City and Philadelphia, including early tornado theorists James Pollard Espy and William Charles Redfield. Scientists disagreed whether there was whirling, convergent, or rotational motion. A conclusion that remains accurate today is that the most intense damage tends to be on right side of a tornado (with respect to direction of forward movement), which was found to be generally easterly).
 1840: The earliest known intensive study of a tornadic event published in Europe, by French scientist Athanase Peltier.
 1865: The first in India and earliest known scientific survey of a tornado that analyzed structure and dynamics was published in 1865 by Indian scientist Chunder Sikur Chatterjee. The path damage survey of a tornado that occurred at Pundooah (now Pandua), Hugli district, West Bengal, India, was documented on maps and revealed multiple vortices, the tornadocyclone, and direction of rotation, predating work by John Park Finley, Alfred Wegener, Johannes Letzmann, and Ted Fujita.

Exceptional tornado droughts

Longest span without a tornado rated F5/EF5 in the United States 

Before the Greensburg EF5 tornado on May 4, 2007, it had been eight years and one day since the United States had a confirmed F5/EF5 tornado. Prior to Greensburg, the last confirmed F5/EF5 had hit the southern Oklahoma City metro area and surrounding communities on May 3, 1999. This stretch was later surpassed by an ongoing drought which began on May 20, 2013; it is now the longest interval without an F5/EF5 tornado since official records began in 1950.

Years without tornado rated violent (F4/EF4+) in United States 
2018 was the only year since official records began in 1950 that no tornado in the United States was rated in the violent class (F4/EF4+).

Exceptional survivors

Longest distance carried by a tornado 
Matt Suter of Fordland, Missouri holds the record for the longest-known distance traveled by anyone picked up by a tornado who survived their ordeal.

Exceptional coincidences

Codell, Kansas
The small town of Codell, Kansas, was hit by a tornado on the same date (May 20) three consecutive years: 1916, 1917, and 1918. The United States has about 100,000 thunderstorms per year; less than 1% produce a tornado. The odds of this coincidence occurring again are extremely small.

Tanner/Harvest, Alabama
Tanner, a small town in northern Alabama, was hit by an F5 tornado on April 3, 1974 and was struck again 45 minutes later by a second F5 (however, the rating is disputed and it may have been high-end F4), demolishing what remained of the town. Thirty-seven years later, on April 27, 2011 (the largest and deadliest outbreak since 1974), Tanner was hit yet again by the EF5 2011 Hackleburg–Phil Campbell tornado, which produced high-end EF4 damage in the southern portion of town. The  suburban community of Harvest, Alabama, just to the northeast, also sustained major impacts from all three Tanner tornadoes, and was also hit by destructive tornadoes in 1995 and 2012.

Moore, Oklahoma

The south Oklahoma City suburb of Moore, Oklahoma was hit by violent tornadoes (which have ratings of at least F/EF4) in 1999, 2003, 2010, and 2013. The 1999 and 2013 events were rated F5 and EF5, respectively. In total, about 23 tornadoes have struck within the immediate vicinity of Moore since 1890, the most recent of which was an EF2 tornado on March 25, 2015.

Jackson, Tennessee
The city of Jackson, Tennessee has been hit by an F4/EF4 tornado four separate times, in 1999, 2003, and 2 in 2008. All four of these tornadoes occurred after dark and were preceded or followed by a separate F3/EF3 tornado that caused additional destruction in the Jackson area.

Hazlehurst/Puckett, Mississippi
Two F4 tornadoes, occurring on January 23, 1969, and March 29, 1976, took extremely similar paths across much of Southern Mississippi. Both directly struck the towns of Hazlehurst and Puckett. The first tornado of the two killed 32 people across its path.

Dolores, Uruguay
The small town of Dolores, Uruguay has been hit multiple times by intense tornadoes. On November 25, 1985, the city was hit by an intense tornado rated as an F3. On December 8, 2012, 27 years later, another intense tornado occurred in the outskirts of the city. On April 15, 2016, an EF3 tornado destroyed large portions of the city.

Arabi, Louisiana
On March 22, 2022, an EF3 tornado struck the New Orleans metropolitan area. On December 14 of that year, another tornado, rated EF2, affected many of the same areas, with the two tornado tracks overlapping in parts of Terrytown and Arabi.

Warner Robins, Georgia
The city of Warner Robins, Georgia was struck by four tornadoes during the mid-1950s, including two on the same day in 1953. Three of the tornadoes were rated F2 or stronger while an F1 tornado also caused major damage to the city.

See also 

 Weather records
 List of tropical cyclone extremes
 Tornado myths
 List of F5 and EF5 tornadoes
 List of F4 and EF4 tornadoes
 List of tornadoes and tornado outbreaks
 List of tornado-related deaths at schools
 List of tornadoes by calendar day
 List of tornadoes with confirmed satellite tornadoes

Notes

References

External links 
 More on tornadoes: Records, the Fujita scale, and our observations by Chuck Doswell
 Tornado Records from the Global Weather & Climate Extremes (World Meteorological Organization)

Tornado
Records
Tornado-related lists
Lists of weather records
Lists of superlatives